A crotyl group is an organic functional group with the formula RCH2CH=CHCH3. Systematically, it is called a but-2-en-1-yl group and exhibits geometric isomerism, being either cis (Z) or trans (E). There are many simple compounds in which the crotyl group forms base carbon chain: crotyl alcohol, crotonaldehyde, crotonic acid, and crotyl acrylate are examples.

Synthesis of crotylates
Crotylate (crotyl anions) can be synthesised from 2-butene (either isomer): this reaction must be performed in the presence of organometallic reagents, as a base, usually alkyl lithium, or any alkylates of s-block metals, in a solvent, typically THF, and at low temperatures, generally below -20 °C. The negative charge is delocalised over three of the carbon atoms of the crotylate group and there is resonance between the two possible delocalised forms (one for each terminal carbon).

Crotylation reactions
Crotylation readily occurs with alkoxy boronates to form crotylboronates.

Crotylboronates are useful reagents in the formation of crotyl alcohols. They react with the acidic protons of aldehydes to form alcohols. The mechanism involves a six-membered ring involving the carbonyl oxygen and boron in a chair-like structure. Such reactions are highly diastereoselective.

Alkenyl groups